This is a list of museums in Malta.

 Abbatija Tad-Dejr
 Bir Mula Heritage
 Borġ in-Nadur
 Casa Rocca Piccola
 Domvs Romana
 Fort Rinella
 Fortifications Interpretation Centre
 Ġgantija
 Għar Dalam
 Gozo Museum of Archaeology
 Gran Castello Historic House
 Ħaġar Qim
 Ħal Saflieni Hypogeum
 Lascaris War Rooms
 Malta at War Museum
 Malta Classic Car Museum
 Malta Aviation Museum
 Malta Maritime Museum
 Malta Postal Museum
 Mdina Cathedral Museum
 Mnajdra Temples
 MUŻA
 National Museum of Archaeology
 National Museum of Ethnography
 National Museum of Natural History
 National War Museum
 Natural Science Museum
 Old Prison
 Palace Armoury
 Palazzo Falson
 Police Museum
 Saluting Battery
 Skorba Temples
 St. Paul's Catacombs
 Ta' Ħaġrat Temples
 Ta' Kola Windmill
 Tarxien Temples
 The State Rooms
 Tunnara Museum
 Wignacourt Museum
 Wignacourt Tower
 Żabbar Sanctuary Museum

See also

 List of museums
 History of Malta
 Tourism in Malta
 Culture of Malta

References

External links
 

Museums

Malta
Museums
Museums
Malta